This is a list containing the Billboard Hot Latin Tracks number-ones of 2000.

See also
2000 in Latin music
Billboard Hot Latin Tracks

References

2000 record charts
Lists of Billboard Hot Latin Songs number-one songs
2000 in Latin music